The vice president of Guinea-Bissau is a former political position in Guinea-Bissau. The position was established in September 1973, and abolished in December 1991.

Below is a list of office-holders:

References

See also
List of presidents of Guinea-Bissau
List of prime ministers of Guinea-Bissau

Politics of Guinea-Bissau
Guinea-Bissau
Government of Guinea-Bissau